Lara Rabal Bosch (born 2 April 1983) is a Spanish former football midfielder, who spent her entire playing career with RCD Espanyol of Spain's Primera División. She was one of the three captains of the team.

In 2013 Rabal retired from playing but joined Espanyol's coaching staff.

Titles
 Spanish league: 2006
 Spanish Cup: 2006, 2009, 2010

References

1983 births
Living people
Spanish women's footballers
RCD Espanyol Femenino players
Primera División (women) players
Women's association football midfielders